Glasgow Craigton was a  burgh constituency represented in the House of Commons of the Parliament of the United Kingdom from 1955 until 1983.

It elected one Member of Parliament (MP) using the first-past-the-post voting system.

Boundaries 
1955–1974: The County of the City of Glasgow ward of Craigton, and parts of Fairfield and Pollokshields wards.

1974–1983: The County of the City of Glasgow ward of Craigton, and part of Pollokshields ward.

Members of Parliament

Elections

Elections in the 1950s

Elections in the 1960s

Elections in the 1970s 

This constituency underwent boundary changes between the 1970 and February 1974 general elections and thus calculation of change in vote share is not meaningful.

References 

Historic parliamentary constituencies in Scotland (Westminster)
Constituencies of the Parliament of the United Kingdom established in 1955
Constituencies of the Parliament of the United Kingdom disestablished in 1983
Politics of Glasgow
Govan
Pollokshields